Pregrada is a town and municipality in  Krapina-Zagorje County in Croatia. In the 2011 census, there were 6,594 inhabitants in the following settlements:

 Benkovo, population 326
 Bregi Kostelski, population 269
 Bušin, population 139
 Cigrovec, population 414
 Donja Plemenšćina, population 138
 Gabrovec, population 59
 Gorjakovo, population 344
 Gornja Plemenšćina, population 273
 Klenice, population 80
 Kostel, population 137
 Kostelsko, population 244
 Mala Gora, population 169
 Marinec, population 118
 Martiša Ves, population 19
 Pavlovec Pregradski, population 229
 Pregrada, population 1,828
  Sopot, population 330
 Stipernica, population 172
 Svetojurski Vrh, population 166
 Valentinovo, population 163
 Velika Gora, population 86
 Vinagora, population 41
 Višnjevec, population 174
 Vojsak, population 157
 Vrhi Pregradski, population 395
 Vrhi Vinagorski, population 124

In the 2011 census, the absolute majority were Croats.

History
The name Pregrada is first mentioned on August 9, 1334 in the statutes of the Zagreb Kaptol. The parish is certainly much older, because it was listed as the oldest one in the Archdiocese of Zagorje.

In the late 19th and early 20th century, Pregrada was a district capital in Varaždin County of the Kingdom of Croatia-Slavonia.

Twin towns - twin cities
  Jánoshida – Hungary

References

External links

 Pregrada official site
 Pregrada.info - Unofficial Pregrada news portal

Cities and towns in Croatia
Populated places in Krapina-Zagorje County
Varaždin County (former)